Oliver Graham Chris (born 2 November 1978) is an English actor. He has appeared in television series, TV films and on the stage. His work has included theatrical productions in London's West End and Broadway in New York City.

Early life
Chris was born in Tunbridge Wells, Kent. He passed his eleven-plus exam and attended Tunbridge Wells Grammar School for Boys before moving to the Michael Hall Steiner School in his fourth year. He later attended the Central School of Speech and Drama. In 2005, he completed an evening class at Birkbeck College and was subsequently accepted for a degree course in history, politics and philosophy.

Career
Chris has appeared in several comedy series, including The Office, Green Wing, According to Bex, Nathan Barley, The IT Crowd, Rescue Me and Bluestone 42.

In 2004, Chris re-wrote the lyrics to the Beatles' "Let It Be" to a song about the England football player Wayne Rooney and recorded it in collaboration with the actor Stephen Campbell Moore and a number of other actors and journalists. The song was reprised and re-recorded, with rewritten lyrics, for the 2006 Fifa World Cup and became a hit on YouTube, with 200,000 hits.

Chris has also narrated most of the Alex Rider series of audiobooks by Anthony Horowitz, although Dan Stevens replaced him as reader for Snakehead, Crocodile Tears and Scorpia Rising.

In early 2006, Chris played the role of Captain Leonard in Sharpe's Challenge, starring Sean Bean, while 2007 saw him in the TV comedy Bonkers, written by Sally Wainwright as well as Petruchio in The Taming of the Shrew at the Wilton's Music Hall. In 2006, he also appeared as Christian in Cyrano de Bergerac at the Royal Exchange Theatre, Manchester. He later appeared in Peter Hall's production of The Portrait of a Lady. He made his West End debut in late 2008 in Lisa Kron's comedy, Well. In 2010, he appeared alongside Judi Dench in Hall's production of A Midsummer Night's Dream at the Rose Theatre, Kingston.

Chris was cast in Ben Miller's feature-length debut comedy film Huge, which premiered in June 2010. In 2011, saw him appear in two episodes of Silent Witness, whilst also playing one of the leading roles in the National Theatre production of One Man, Two Guvnors alongside James Corden. He appeared in three series of the BBC Three comedy Bluestone 42, about a British bomb disposal detachment in Afghanistan. He also played Dr Richard Truscott in the ITV medical drama series Breathless, set in the 1960s, which ran for one series from October 2013.

From 2014 to 2016, Chris played Prince William in the play King Charles III, appearing in the West End and on Broadway. In May 2017, he appeared in the same role in the BBC Two film adaptation.

Between February and May 2017, Chris played Orsino in a production of Twelfth Night at the Royal National Theatre. He also played Friedrich Engels in Richard Bean and Clive Coleman's new play Young Marx, the opening production at the Bridge Theatre in December 2017. In 2019, Chris took on the roles of Oberon and Theseus in Nicholas Hytner's adaptation of A Midsummer Night's Dream at the Bridge Theatre, London.  Paul Taylor, in his review for The Independent, described Chris' Oberon as "superlatively funny" while Stig Abell in the TLS opined that doubling the roles of Oberon and Theseus allowed Chris "to be by turns sublime and ridiculous, stuffy and lusty".

Chris' writing credits include Ralegh: The Treason Trial, staged at the Winchester Great Hall and then the Sam Wanamaker Playhouse in 2018 and Jack Absolute Flies Again, based on Sheridan's The Rivals, co-written with Richard Bean, due to be staged at the Olivier Theatre in 2020.

Personal life
Until 2012, he was engaged to actress Rachael Stirling, whom he had been dating since 2007.

Filmography

Theatre

References

External links

1978 births
Living people
English male television actors
English male film actors
English male stage actors
Alumni of the Royal Central School of Speech and Drama
Alumni of Birkbeck, University of London
21st-century English male actors
People from Royal Tunbridge Wells
People educated at Tunbridge Wells Grammar School for Boys
Male actors from Kent
Waldorf school alumni
Audiobook narrators